The 1971 Vermont Catamounts football team was an American football team that represented  the University of Vermont in the Yankee Conference during the 1971 NCAA College Division football season. In their second year under head coach Joe Scannella, the team compiled a 2–7 record.

Schedule

References

Vermont
Vermont Catamounts football seasons
Vermont Catamounts football